Longipalpus is a genus of beetles belonging to the family Cerambycidae.

The species of this genus are found in Southeastern Asia and Australia.

Species

Species:

Longipalpus bifasciatus 
Longipalpus carabiformis 
Longipalpus constricticollis

References

Obriini
Cerambycidae genera